Kalivati Tawake (born 16 November 1988) is a Fijian rugby union player who played for the  in the Super Rugby competition.  His position of choice is prop.

He  currently (2021) plays for Biarritz Olympique Pays Basque in France as prop.

In 2019 Tawake suffered a knee injury playing for Fiji against Tonga ruling him out of the rugby world cup squad.

References

External links 
 

Fijian rugby union players
1988 births
Living people
Fiji international rugby union players
Fijian Drua players
Rugby union props
New South Wales Waratahs players
Biarritz Olympique players